Douglas Cameron (21 March 1903 – 10 January 1996) was a New Zealand cricketer. He played in four first-class matches for Wellington from 1929 to 1933.

See also
 List of Wellington representative cricketers

References

External links
 

1903 births
1996 deaths
New Zealand cricketers
Wellington cricketers
Cricketers from Whanganui